Anjali Chand (born 16 September 1995) is a Nepali cricketer who plays for the Nepali national women's team. She has scored a century in a domestic national tournament, becoming the third Nepali woman to score a century. She played in the 2014 Asian Games as a batswoman for Nepal.

In November 2019, she was named in Nepal's squad for the women's tournament at the 2019 South Asian Games. She made her Women's Twenty20 International (WT20I) debut for Nepal, against the Maldives, on 2 December 2019 in the opening match of the tournament. In the match, she took six wickets for no runs from thirteen deliveries, recording the best bowling figures in a WT20I match. The record stood in place until Frederique Overdijk broke it in August 2021. She also took a hat-trick from her last three deliveries.

References

External links
 
 

Living people
1995 births
Nepalese women cricketers
Cricketers at the 2014 Asian Games
Asian Games competitors for Nepal
Nepal women Twenty20 International cricketers
South Asian Games bronze medalists for Nepal
South Asian Games medalists in cricket